Killarney is an unincorporated community in Early County, in the U.S. state of Georgia.

History
A post office called Killarney was established in 1900, and remained in operation until 1905. The community was named after Killarney, in Ireland.

References

Unincorporated communities in Early County, Georgia
Unincorporated communities in Georgia (U.S. state)